Andrena erythrogaster, the red-bellied miner bee, is a species of miner bee native to North America.

References

erythrogaster